Milkeh or Milekeh, also rendered as Milgeh or Millehgah or Milleh Gawana, may refer to:
 Milkeh-ye Baqer
 Milkeh-ye Buchan
 Milkeh-ye Shir Khan